The 2015–16 TSG 1899 Hoffenheim season is the 117th season in the club's football history. In the previous season, Hoffenheim had finished in eighth place.

First team squad
As of 24 August 2015

Players out on loan

Transfers

In

Out

Competitions

Bundesliga

League table

Results summary

Results by round

Matches

DFB-Pokal

References

 

Hoffenheim
TSG 1899 Hoffenheim seasons